WRBG-LP (106.5 FM) is a radio station licensed to serve Millsboro, Delaware. The station is owned by Rhythm and Blues Group Harmony Association, Inc.  It airs a Variety format featuring a diverse mix of religious and secular music, talk shows, and community affairs programs.

The station was assigned the WRBG-LP call letters by the Federal Communications Commission on January 21, 2002.

See also
List of community radio stations in the United States

References

External links
 

RBG-LP
Community radio stations in the United States
RBG-LP
Millsboro, Delaware